The  is a local political party in Okinawa, Japan. Contrary to what its official English name might suggest, the party is considered as largely conservative.

The party was founded on December 27, 2005 by Mikio Shimoji. He has been the member of the Liberal Democratic Party, at the House of Representatives of the National Diet. In July 2005, he left LDP as he was against the alliance between LDP and New Komeito Party. He then founded the Political Group of Okinawa Revolution.

As a local conservative party formed recently, the party is similar to New Party Daichi in Hokkaidō.

External links
 The party's official website

Conservative parties in Japan
Political parties established in 2005
2005 establishments in Japan
Regional parties in Japan
Politics of Okinawa